"Thank ABBA for the Music" is a medley of songs originally released by pop group ABBA, performed by Steps, Tina Cousins, Cleopatra, B*Witched and Billie. The medley consists of "Take a Chance on Me", "Dancing Queen", "Mamma Mia", and "Thank You for the Music". It was originally performed during the 1999 Brit Awards, which occurred on 16 February, and its release coincided with the debut of the ABBA musical Mamma Mia!. The medley peaked at number four on the UK Singles Chart in April 1999 and reached the top 10 in Australia, Ireland, New Zealand, and Sweden.

Track listings

Personnel
 Tina Cousins – lead and backing vocals
 Billie Piper – lead and backing vocals

Cleopatra
 Cleo Higgins – lead vocals
 [Yonah Higgins – backing vocals
 Zainam Higgins – backing vocals

B*Witched
 Lindsay Armaou – backing vocals
 Edele Lynch – lead vocals
 Keavy Lynch – backing vocals
 Sinead O'Carroll – backing vocals

Steps
 Lee Latchford-Evans – lead and backing vocals
 Claire Richards – lead and backing vocals
 Lisa Scott-Lee – lead and backing vocals
 Faye Tozer – lead and backing vocals
 Ian "H" Watkins – lead and backing vocals

Charts

Weekly charts

Year-end charts

Certifications

References

External links
 

Songs about musicians
1999 singles
B*Witched songs
Billie Piper songs
Epic Records singles
Music medleys
Songs written by Benny Andersson and Björn Ulvaeus
Songs written by Stig Anderson
Steps (group) songs
Tina Cousins songs